"Speak to the Sky" is the debut single by Rick Springfield. It reached No. 6 in Australia, No. 8 on the Canadian adult contemporary chart, No. 10 on the Canadian pop chart, No. 14 on the U.S. pop chart, and No. 16 on the U.S. Adult Contemporary chart in 1972. It was featured on his 1972 album Beginnings.

The song was arranged by Del Newman and produced by Robie Porter.

The song ranked No. 96 on Billboard magazine's Top 100 singles of 1972.

Other versions
Lonnie Donegan released a version of the song as a single in 1972 in the UK, but it did not chart.
Judith Durham and the Seekers released a version of the song on their 1997 album Future Road.
Durham released an a cappella version of the song on her 2009 album Up Close and Personal.

References

1972 songs
1972 debut singles
Songs written by Rick Springfield
Rick Springfield songs
Lonnie Donegan songs
The Seekers songs
Capitol Records singles
Pye Records singles